Yushan North Peak (Chinese: 玉山北峰; Pinyin: Yùshān běifēng) is a mountain of the Yushan Range located in the Yushan National Park. With a height of 3,858 m (12,657 ft), it is the 4th tallest mountain in Taiwan and the 3rd tallest in the Yushan Range. At the peak is the Yushan Weather Station, the highest weather station and building in Taiwan.

See also 

 Yushan National Park
 Yushan Range
 100 Peaks of Taiwan
 List of mountains in Taiwan

References 

Mountains of Taiwan
Mountains of Asia